Lawrence Daniel Warford III (born June 18, 1991) is a former American football guard. He was drafted by the Detroit Lions in the third round of the 2013 NFL Draft. He made the Pro Bowl in all three of his seasons with the New Orleans Saints. He played college football at Kentucky.

Early years
Born in San Diego, California to an African American father and a Samoan mother, Warford attended Oceanside High School during his freshman and sophomore year. By his sophomore year, he had earned a starting job as offensive tackle, protecting quarterback Jordan Wynn. One of his teammates on the offensive line was Brian Schwenke. After Warford's father retired from the United States Navy, his family moved to Richmond, Kentucky, where he attended Madison Central High School and became a two-year all-state honoree. In his senior year, he was named a first-team all-state selection by the Associated Press and Louisville Courier-Journal.

Regarded as a three-star recruit by Rivals.com, Warford was listed as the No. 30 guard prospect in his class, behind Chance Warmack (No. 20) and Alvin Bailey (No. 27). Warford chose Kentucky over Auburn and Louisville.

College career
Warford attended the University of Kentucky, where he played for the Kentucky Wildcats football team from 2009 to 2012.  He started his career mostly as a reserve at right guard, appearing in 10 games, before earning a starting spot his sophomore year. He would go on to start 37 consecutive games for the Wildcats, and earned second-team All-Southeastern Conference (SEC) honors in three consecutive seasons.

Professional career

Detroit Lions
Warford was selected by the Detroit Lions in the third round, with the 65th overall pick, of the 2013 NFL Draft. He signed his rookie contract with the Lions on May 9, 2013; financial terms were not disclosed.

In his rookie season, Warford became an immediate starter at right guard for the Lions, and he did not give up a sack the entire 2013 season. He was named Pro Football Focus's Rookie of the Year. He was named the 2013 recipient of the Detroit Lions/Detroit Sports Broadcasters Association Rookie of the Year Award. Warford started all 16 regular-season games as a rookie.

New Orleans Saints
On March 9, 2017, Warford signed a four-year, $34 million contract with the New Orleans Saints. In his first season in New Orleans, he started 14 games at right guard, missing two games due to an abdomen injury, on his way to his first Pro Bowl.  In 2018, Warford started 15 games and made his second straight Pro Bowl appearance.

In 2019, Warford was selected to his third straight Pro Bowl.

On May 8, 2020, Warford was released by the Saints after three seasons. He decided to opt out of the 2020 season due to the COVID-19 pandemic on July 28, 2020.

References

External links

New Orleans Saints bio
Kentucky Wildcats bio
Official website (archived from 2013)

1991 births
Living people
American sportspeople of Samoan descent
Players of American football from Kentucky
African-American players of American football
American football offensive guards
Kentucky Wildcats football players
Detroit Lions players
New Orleans Saints players
National Conference Pro Bowl players
Players of American football from San Diego
People from Richmond, Kentucky
21st-century African-American sportspeople